Minuscule 514 (in the Gregory-Aland numbering), ε 262 Θε14 (in the Soden numbering), is a Greek minuscule manuscript of the New Testament, on parchment. Palaeographically it has been assigned to the 12th century. 
Scrivener labelled it by number 500. The manuscript has complex contents.

Description 

The codex contains the complete text of the four Gospels on 227 parchment leaves (size ) with only one lacunae (John 20:18-21:25). Written in one column per page, 23 lines per page, in neat characters.

There is also a division according to the Ammonian Sections, with references to the Eusebian Canons.

Text 

The Greek text of the codex is a representative of the Byzantine text-type. Hermann von Soden included it to the textual family Kx. Aland placed it in Category V.

According to the Claremont Profile Method it represents textual family Kx in Luke 1 and Luke 20. In Luke 10 no profile was made.

History 

The manuscript is dated by the INTF to the 12th century.

In 1727 the manuscript came from Constantinople to England and was presented to archbishop of Canterbury, William Wake, together with minuscules 73, 74, 506-520. Wake presented it to the Christ Church College in Oxford.

The manuscript was added to the list of New Testament minuscule manuscripts by F. H. A. Scrivener (500) and C. R. Gregory (514). Gregory saw it in 1883.

It is currently housed at the Christ Church (Wake 30) in Oxford.

See also 

 List of New Testament minuscules
 Biblical manuscript
 Textual criticism

References

Further reading

External links 
 

Greek New Testament minuscules
12th-century biblical manuscripts